Liliana Queiroz (born 10 August 1985) is a Portuguese model. She won the 2005 Miss Playboy TV Latin America and Iberia competition. 
Since her Playboy selection, Queiroz has appeared in several Portuguese television series.

Filmography
Big Brother VIP (reality show; appeared as herself in 2013)
Novos Malucos do Riso (television series, several episodes in 2009) 
Amália (2008 film, Namorada Ricciardi)Malucos no Hospital (television series, several episodes in 2008)Deixa-me Amar (television series, several episodes in 2007, Iolanda Falcão)Tu e Eu (television series, several episodes in 2007, Íris)Camilo Em Sarilhos (television series, several episodes in 2006, Natasha)Malucos na Praia (television series, several episodes in 2005)Maré Alta (television series, several episodes in 2004, 2005)A Última Ceia (television series; appeared as herself in 11 December 2010 episode)Episódio Especial (television series; appeared as herself in 29 August and 5 September 2009 episodes)Salve-se Quem Puder (television series; appeared as herself in a 2007 episode)Globos de Ouro 2006 (2007 television movie; appeared as herself)HermanSIC (television series; appeared as herself in 3 September 2006 episode)Globos de Ouro 2005 (2006 television movie; appeared as herself)Miss Playboy TV 2005'' (television documentary; appeared as herself - Miss Portugal)

References

1985 births
Living people
Portuguese female models